Roscoe Township is a township in Davis County, Iowa, USA.  As of the 2000 census, its population was 233.

Geography
Roscoe Township covers an area of 25.5 square miles (66.05 square kilometers); of this, 0.05 square miles (0.14 square kilometers) or 0.21 percent is water.

Unincorporated towns
 Waneta
 Wanetta Corner
(This list is based on USGS data and may include former settlements.)

Adjacent townships
 Prairie Township (north)
 Jackson Township, Van Buren County (east)
 Grove Township (west)

Cemeteries
The township contains three cemeteries: Brown, Hubbard and Round Grove.

References
 U.S. Board on Geographic Names (GNIS)
 United States Census Bureau cartographic boundary files

External links
 US-Counties.com
 City-Data.com

Townships in Davis County, Iowa
Townships in Iowa